Livernois Avenue (also referred to as Livernois Road, Livernois Street, Avenue of Fashion, and Main Street) is a major thoroughfare and section line road on the west side of Metro Detroit in the US state of Michigan.

Route description

Within Detroit

Livernois Avenue starts out in southwest Detroit across Jefferson Avenue from Fort Wayne, carrying only southbound traffic, with northbound traffic carried on Dragoon Street one block east. Both roads converge together a block north of Vernor Highway, from this point northward, Livernois carries traffic in both directions. At Alaska Street (between Tireman Street and Joy Road), it turns from north-northwestward to due north. Livernois Avenue then becomes a boulevard at M-5 (Grand River Avenue) and remains one as far north as Margareta Street, with only a brief interruption for two blocks between M-8 (Davison Street) and Grand Street. It is along this stretch that Livernois passes the western edge of the University of Detroit Mercy's main campus. At 7 Mile Road, Livernois becomes the "Avenue of Fashion," and intersects the eastern end of West Outer Drive.

Within Oakland County
Livernois Avenue becomes less prominent as it crosses M-102 (8 Mile Road) into Ferndale, but is still lined with commercial businesses. Livernois then becomes a divided highway again at Marshall Street (between 8 and 9 Mile) and continues to be one until its first physical interruption at 9 Mile Road for a supermarket parking lot. Livernois then starts up again, still a divided roadway and as a residential street, one block north and continues until it is interrupted again just south of the Ferndale city limits.

Livernois Avenue then picks up as an undivided commercial road again at M-1 (Woodward Avenue) in Pleasant Ridge as Main Street and with only northbound traffic-it does not become a two-way street until the westbound Interstate 696 (I-696) service drive, two blocks north. It retains the Main Street name through the cities of Royal Oak and Clawson before becoming Livernois again upon completely entering Troy at Maple (15 Mile) Road. Livernois then passes under I-75 without an interchange and then crosses Big Beaver Road a couple blocks north.

Livernois Avenue continues northward into Rochester Hills, where it crosses over M-59, again without an interchange. Several miles to the north after a roundabout at Tienken Road, Livernois becomes a residential dirt road. After a staggered junction at Dutton Road which crosses Paint Creek, Livernois ends at Orion Road in southern Oakland Township.

Name
Livernois Avenue was named after Francois Livernois, a French farmer who resided in the area during the 18th century.

History
Between 7 and 8 Mile roads, Livernois is called the "Avenue of Fashion". This section of Livernois was a major retail destination in Detroit up till the 1950s when new suburban malls pulled away shoppers.

Livernois Avenue was the site of the 1975 Livernois-Fenkell riot when the white owner of a bar located on the road near Fenkell Street in Detroit shot and killed a black man as he was attempting a carjacking.

In 2006, the portion between Grove Street (south of McNichols Road) and 7 Mile Road became the first stretch of Livernois Avenue in Detroit to be converted into a divided boulevard. The boulevard has since been extended both north to 8 Mile Road in 2007 and south to Grand River Avenue in the late 2000s. The median north of Margareta Street would later be removed in 2019 as part of a major road construction project.

On October 21, 2019, Livernois Avenue was vacated and permanently closed between Jefferson Avenue and South Street in the Delray neighborhood, to facilitate construction of the United States Port of Entry for the Gordie Howe International Bridge. The following year, on July 17, 2020, the portion north of South Street to the Norfolk Southern railroad was vacated and permanently closed as well, along with the entirety of Dragoon Street between Jefferson Avenue and Fort Street for the same purpose. Also on that same day, the now southernmost section of Livernois between Fort Street and the railroad was reconfigured to facilitate two-way traffic, and to provide a restricted contractor access point for the US POE construction activities beyond.

See also

References

Metro Detroit
Streets in Michigan